Raymond McNeil (born October 14, 1984) is an American football offensive lineman who is currently a free agent. He played college football at Fort Valley State University and attended Jurupa Valley High School in Jurupa Valley, California. He has also been a member of the Green Bay Blizzard, Milwaukee Iron/Mustangs, Utah Blaze, Spokane Shock, San Jose SaberCats, Tampa Bay Storm and Jacksonville Sharks.

College career
McNeil played for the Fort Valley State Wildcats from 2002 to 2005. He was the team's starter his final two and a half years. McNeil was a Second Team All-Southern Intercollegiate Athletic Conference selection as a senior.

Professional career

Green Bay Blizzard
McNeil signed with the Green Bay Blizzard in 2008. He was named First Team All-af2 following the season. McNeil returned to the Blizzard in January 2009.

Milwaukee Iron

Utah Blaze

Spokane Shock
On May 30, 2011, McNeil was traded with Erik Meyer to the Spokane Shock for Khreem Smith and Antonio Narcisse.

Return to Milwaukee
McNeil returned to Milwaukee franchise on September 30, 2011.

San Jose SaberCats
In November 2012, McNeil was assigned to the San Jose SaberCats.

Tampa Bay Storm
On November 5, 2014, McNeil was retained by the Tampa Bay Storm.

Jacksonville Sharks
McNeil was assigned to the Jacksonville Sharks on March 25, 2015.

Return to Tampa Bay
McNeil was assigned to the Storm on January 19, 2017. He earned First Team All-Arena honors in 2017. The Storm folded in December 2017.

Shanghai Skywalkers
McNeil was selected by the Shanghai Skywalkers in the third round of the 2017 CAFL Draft.

Baltimore Brigade
On March 26, 2018, McNeil was assigned to the Baltimore Brigade.

Atlantic City Blackjacks
On April 4, 2019, McNeil was assigned to the Atlantic City Blackjacks.

References

External links

Jurupa Valley, California
Living people
1984 births
Players of American football from California
American football offensive linemen
Fort Valley State Wildcats football players
Milwaukee Mustangs (2009–2012) players
Green Bay Blizzard players
Utah Blaze players
Spokane Shock players
Sportspeople from Riverside County, California
San Jose SaberCats players
Tampa Bay Storm players
Jacksonville Sharks players
Milwaukee Iron players
Shanghai Skywalkers players
Baltimore Brigade players
Atlantic City Blackjacks players